Gerald Joseph Bingham Jr. (born June 25, 1953, in Chicago, Illinois) is an American artist who has worked in the fields of comic books, commercial illustration, and design. He is known for his artwork on Marvel Team-Up and the DC Comics graphic novel Batman: Son of the Demon.

Biography 
Given his first break by veteran comics artist Dan Adkins, Bingham's first published comics work was a Green Arrow backup story in World's Finest Comics #251 (June–July 1978). From there, Bingham drew comics for Marvel Comics, First Comics, TSR, Malibu Comics, Dark Horse Comics, Heavy Metal, and others.  He drew the Batman: Son of the Demon graphic novel in 1987, which introduced a character later revealed to be Damian Wayne. This graphic novel reputedly "restored DC Comics to first place in sales after fifteen years."

Leaving comics in the late 1990s, Bingham moved to the West Coast, where he did production art for the movies, designing props, special effects and monster make-up. He contributed design work for Walt Disney Parks and Resorts, shopping centers, Universal Studios, and the Hollywood Christmas Parade. In addition, Bingham has illustrated paperback, game, and magazine covers.

Education 
Bingham attended the American Academy of Art, the Scottsdale Artists School, the California Art Institute, and UCLA.

Awards 
 Jack Kirby Award, 1984 – Best Graphic Album: Beowulf
 Golden Apple Award, 1987 – Best Graphic Novel: Batman: Son of the Demon
 Primetime Emmy Award for Outstanding Animated Program, 1999 – Background Designer (animation): Todd McFarlane's Spawn

Bibliography

DC Comics
 
 Alien Nation #1 (movie adaptation)(1988)
 Army at War #1 (1978)
 Batman Confidential #50–54 (2011)
 Batman: In Darkest Knight #1 (1994)
 Batman: Son of the Demon graphic novel (1987)
 DC Retroactive: Batman - The '80s #1 (2011)
 Ghosts #72 (1979)
 G.I. Combat #211 (1978)
 Hawkman vol. 3 #27 (1995)
 House of Mystery #270, 274 (1979)
 Mystery in Space #112 (1980)
 Outsiders #13 (1986)
 Secret Origins vol. 2 #3 (Captain Marvel) (1986)
 Secrets of Haunted House #33 (1981)
 Time Warp #5 (1980)
 The Warlord #103 (1986)
 Weird War Tales #70 (1978)
 Who's Who in the DC Universe #16 (1992)
 Who's Who: The Definitive Directory of the DC Universe #5, 7, 19–20, 23 (1985–1987)
 World's Finest Comics #251 (Green Arrow) (1978)

First Comics
 Beowulf graphic novel (1984)
 Warp! #10–15, 17–18 (1984)

HM Communications, Inc.
 Heavy Metal #v7#3, #v7#7 (1983)

Marvel Comics
 
 The Amazing Spider-Man #366–367 (1992)
 Black Panther #13–15 (1979)
 Captain America #246 (1980)
 Iron Man #131–135, Annual #5 (1980–1982)
 Marvel Premiere #51–53 (1979–1980)
 Marvel Super-Heroes vol. 2 #3 (Captain Marvel) (1990)
 Marvel Team-Up #99, 101, 103–104 (1980–1981)
 Marvel Two-in-One #61–63, 66, 76 (1980–1981)
 Midnight Sons Unlimited #1 (1993)
 The Spectacular Spider-Man Annual #13–14 (1993–1994)
 Spider-Man Unlimited #1 (1993)
 Spider-Woman #27 (1980)
 Web of Spider-Man Annual #10 (1994)
 What If #27 (1981)
 X-Factor #113 (1995)

Epic Comics
 Onyx Overlord #1–4 (1992–1993)

Malibu Comics
Star Trek: Deep Space Nine - Dax's Comet

References

External links 
 
 
 
 Jerry Bingham at Mike's Amazing World of Comics
 Jerry Bingham at the Unofficial Handbook of Marvel Comics Creators

1953 births
20th-century American artists
21st-century American artists
American comics artists
American make-up artists
Artists from Chicago
DC Comics people
Living people
Marvel Comics people
Role-playing game artists
Special effects people
University of California, Los Angeles alumni